The Autostrada A53 is an Italian motorway which connects Bereguardo and Autostrada A7 to Pavia and its bypass motorway A54.

References

Autostrade in Italy
Transport in Lombardy